Eduardo Mário Mourinha de Almeida (19 December 1908 – 31 March 1990) was a Portuguese footballer who played as a forward.

See also
Association football

References

External links 
 
 

1908 births
Portuguese footballers
Association football forwards
Portugal international footballers
1990 deaths